Floyd "Huston" Huddleston is an American writer and director, best known for his attempts to secure funding for the Hollywood Sci-Fi Museum in 2012 and the Hollywood Horror Museum in 2015. As of 2022 neither museum has plans for construction.  He is also known for "The Greatest Show Ever" and "Six Chicks and a Dead Guy".

Biography

Huston is the son of Floyd Huddleston, an Oscar nominated songwriter, screenwriter, and television producer, and Nancy Adams, a singer.

Huston Huddleston worked in London at Channel 4 as a writer, creating several TV pilots including The Wacky Dooley Show, The Spinal Tap Reunion Special, Vivien Leigh, and the comedy The Greatest Show Ever directed by Joe Dante and starring Mickey Rooney. Huddleston wrote and directed "Six Chicks and a Dead Guy".

He co-wrote the second episode of the fan-made web series Star Trek Continues entitled "Lolani".

He is also the founder and CEO of The Hollywood Science Fiction Foundation, and the Hollywood Horror Foundation.

Legal issues

Huston was arrested on April 24, 2018, and charged with possession of child pornography and other crimes, including contacting a minor with intent to commit a felony. He was held at the Pitchess Detention Center North Facility on $750,000 bail and pleaded not guilty on May 22, 2018. His court date was June 12, 2018.  On June 21, Huddleston pled guilty to one misdemeanor charge of possessing child pornography.

References

External links

Official website of the Hollywood Sci-Fi Museum
Official website of the Hollywood Horror Museum

Living people
American directors
American documentary filmmakers
Television producers from California
American television writers
Museum founders
Cultural historians
People from Burbank, California
Screenwriters from California
American people convicted of child pornography offenses
Year of birth missing (living people)